Inessa Korkmaz (born 17 January 1972 in Saratov) is a retired female volleyball player from Russia, who is also known as Inessa Emelyanova. She made her debut for the Soviet National Team in 1989. After 2001 she represented Azerbaijan in international volleyball competitions.

Honours
 1991 FIVB World Cup — 3rd place
 1993 FIVB World Grand Prix — 3rd place
 1993 European Championship — 1st place
 1994 World Championship — 3rd place
 1995 European Championship — 3rd place
 1996 FIVB World Grand Prix — 3rd place
 1997 FIVB World Grand Prix — 1st place
 1997 European Championship — 1st place
 1999 FIVB World Cup — 2nd place
 2000 FIVB World Grand Prix — 2nd place
 2000 Olympic Games — 2nd place
 2001 FIVB World Grand Prix — 3rd place
 2001 European Championship — 1st place
 2005 European Championship — 4th place
 2006 FIVB World Grand Prix — 10th place
 2007 European Championship — 12th place

References

 Profile

External links
 

1972 births
Living people
Sportspeople from Saratov
Russian emigrants to Azerbaijan
Naturalized citizens of Azerbaijan
Russian women's volleyball players
Azerbaijani women's volleyball players
Volleyball players at the 2000 Summer Olympics
Olympic volleyball players of Russia
Olympic silver medalists for Russia
Soviet women's volleyball players
Olympic medalists in volleyball
Medalists at the 2000 Summer Olympics